August Bernhard Valentin Herbing (9 March 1735 in Halberstadt - 26 February 1766 in Magdeburg) was a German organist and composer.

Life
Son of Johann Georg Herbing (1698–1783), who was his first teacher. In 1755 he was assistant organist of the cathedral of Magdeburg. In 1764 he succeeded Georg Tegetmeyer to the position of organist, but he died shortly later.

Works
Musicalische Belustigungen, a collection of 70 lieder 
 part 1, 1758 
 part 2, 1767 
Musikalischer Versuch, 1759
March for keyboard inMusikalisches Allerley, 1761 
few other songs in manuscripts

Sources
Raymond A. Barr's article in New Grove Dictionary of Music
M. Friedlaender: Das deutsche Lied im 18. Jahrhundert, 1902 
H. Kretzschmar, ed.: Ernst Bach: Sammlung auserlesener Fabeln; Valentin Herbing: Musikalischer Versuch, DDT, xlii, 1910
W. Hobohm: Das Magdeburger Musikleben im 18. Jahrhundert, 1985

External links

German classical organists
German male organists
18th-century German composers
1735 births
1766 deaths
Male classical organists